Valdir de Moraes Filho (born 15 March 1972), commonly known as Valdir Bigode, is a Brazilian former footballer who played as a striker.

A prolific striker, Valdir is the twelfth highest goalscorer of Vasco da Gama, with 135 goals in 267 matches, while also being a part of Atlético Mineiro history with 57 goals in 111 appearances.

Career
Born in Rio de Janeiro, Valdir started at Campo Grande Atlético Clube, moving in the same year to Vasco da Gama. There, he was an important part in the conquest of the 1992 to 1994 editions of the Campeonato Carioca, often partnering with Mário Jardel.

In 1997, he passed through Portugal, scoring 5 goals in 13 appearances in the two and half months at Benfica, before returning to Brazil and being the top scorer of the 1997 Copa CONMEBOL won by Atlético Mineiro, partnering with Marques.

After that, he passed through Botafogo and Santos, without major success, before moving back to Atletico Mineiro in 2000. He then returned to Vasco da Gama, spending two seasons there and winning another Campeonato Carioca in 2003.

He then moved abroad again, joining Al-Nasr in Dubai, winning the topscorer award in 2004-05. His final year was in Saudi Arabia. Afterwards, he embarked on a managerial career, mainly at Vasco da Gama.

References

External links

1972 births
Living people
Association football forwards
Footballers from Rio de Janeiro (city)
Brazilian footballers
Brazilian football managers
Brazilian expatriate footballers
Campeonato Brasileiro Série A players
UAE Pro League players
Brazilian expatriate sportspeople in the United Arab Emirates
Expatriate footballers in the United Arab Emirates
Expatriate footballers in Saudi Arabia
Campo Grande Atlético Clube players
CR Vasco da Gama players
São Paulo FC players
S.L. Benfica footballers
Primeira Liga players
Expatriate footballers in Portugal
Brazilian expatriate sportspeople in Portugal
Clube Atlético Mineiro players
Botafogo de Futebol e Regatas players
Santos FC players
Al-Nasr SC (Dubai) players
Dubai CSC players
Campo Grande Atlético Clube managers
CR Vasco da Gama managers
Associação Desportiva Cabofriense managers
Vitória Futebol Clube (ES) managers